Rayne High School is located in Rayne, Louisiana, United States. The school is a part of the Acadia Parish School Board.  Its mascot is the Mighty Wolves.

School uniforms
Beginning in the 1999–2000 school year the school district requires all students to wear school uniforms.

The uniform consists of either navy blue or purples shirts and khaki or plaid pants, shorts, or skirts.

Athletics
Rayne High athletics competes in the LHSAA.

The school competes in several sports, including:
Football
Men's Basketball
Women's Basketball
Baseball
Softball
Golf
Men's Track & Field
Women's Track & Field
Women's Volleyball
Men's Wrestling

References

Public high schools in Louisiana
Schools in Acadia Parish, Louisiana
Rayne, Louisiana